The HOLO card is a contactless smart card used to pay for public transit fares on the island of Oʻahu in Hawaiʻi. The card is used to hold cash value or passes for use on TheBus, and will also be valid on Honolulu's rail system when it opens to the public. The card is used by tapping it on a reader terminal when boarding TheBus, and can be loaded online at the HOLO card's website, over the phone, or in-person at various retail locations.

"Holo" is a Hawaiian word that means to "ride", "go", or "flow." Reduplicated, "holoholo" means "to go out for pleasure."

Background
The HOLO card was created by the City and County of Honolulu as a way to allow seamless transfers between TheBus and the future rail system. Prior to the introduction of the card, TheBus users either paid cash fares or purchased paper passes. INIT was contracted in 2016 to develop, manage, and operate the HOLO card system.

The card was initially released to the public on a pilot basis in December 2018. Paper day, monthly, and yearly passes were phased out beginning in April 2021, and were completely discontinued by July 1, 2021. All cards were issued for free prior to March 1, 2022. There is a $2 fee for new and replacement cards to encourage cards to be reused, with selected discounted fare categories exempted from the fee for new cards or for both new and replacement cards.

Usage
The HOLO card uses a fare-capping system, similar to the Hop Fastpass card used in Portland, Oregon, where users are not charged for additional fares after paying an amount equal to the cost of a day pass over the course of a single day, or after paying an amount equal to the cost of a monthly pass over a single month. The card also includes a transfer function where users who board multiple buses or trains within a  hour window are not charged an additional fare regardless of whether or not they have reached a daily or monthly cap amount. Paying a cash fares does not allow for transfers.

The card is used by first being loaded with cash value or a pass, then by tapping the card on a card reader when boarding a bus. The card will also be used to pass through faregates at rail stations when the rail system opens. Users have the option of creating an account to allow the card to be registered to an individual and reloaded via the HOLO card's website. Registering a card also allows any cash value or passes loaded on the card to be replaced if the card is lost or stolen, and for the card to be remotely disabled at any time.

Use of the card may be extended in the future to include Biki, Honolulu's bikeshare system, paying for admission to City-operated facilities such as the Honolulu Zoo and Hanauma Bay, and municipal parking.

Notes

References

External links
Official website
TheBus fare information

Honolulu Rail Transit
TheBus (Honolulu)
Fare collection systems in the United States
Contactless smart cards
2021 establishments in Hawaii